The Foundation for Liver Research is a UK medical research charity dedicated to hepatology. It funds the Institute of Hepatology in central London.

The website of the Foundation for Liver Research mentions the following:

"The Foundation for Liver Research was established in 1974 to develop and extend research into diseases of the human liver and to enhance medical research generally."

"For over 30 years the Foundation has supported ground-breaking research programmes into liver disease under the direction of Professor Roger Williams, CBE. This work is carried out within the purpose-built Institute of Hepatology located on the King's College campus in Denmark Hill.  The Institute provides laboratory space for up to 40 scientists and is now affiliated to King's College London. Research is organised around major research projects within the overall theme of Liver Cell Injury and Repair. Current areas of research include liver immunology and inflammation, alcoholic and non-alcoholic liver disease, viral hepatitis, liver metabolism and cancer, liver cell injury and metabolomic studies."

In March 2013 the Foundation for Liver Research released a mini-documentary illustrating the work performed at the Institute of Hepatology at the time.

References

External links 
 

Hepatology organizations
Charities based in London
Health charities in the United Kingdom